Ed Tse-chun Young (born November 28, 1931) is a Chinese-born American illustrator and writer of children's picture books. He won one Caldecott Medal for the year's best American picture book and for his lifetime contribution as a children's illustrator he was twice the U.S. nominee for the Hans Christian Andersen Award.

Biography

Ed Young was born on November 28, 1931 in Tianjin, China.  When he was three years old, he and his family moved to Shanghai.  His mother would ring a bell at mealtimes, and he would slide down the banister with his brothers and sisters.  "I have never lost the child in me.  My father would spin endless tales of his own to entertain our imaginations on summer nights lying on the flat roof of our house.  I have never forgotten the images I saw in my mind."  From an early age, Ed loved to create stories and draw pictures and thought he could "disappear" into his own world, brought to life through his illustrations.

In 1951, Young came to the U.S. to study architecture. Instead, he grew more interested in art, and soon switched his major. Young's first job was with a New York advertising agency where he spent his lunch breaks sketching animals at Central Park Zoo. During that time, he received a letter from his father which said, "A successful life and a happy life is one measured by how much you have accomplished for others and not one measured by how much you have done for yourself." According to Young, "I understood then that to realize my potential as an artist was subservient to my worth as a human being.  To be truly successful, I needed to find a place where my work would also inspire others to fuller and happier lives.  I wished to share with everyone my father's words about success – work can, in fact, be the rooftop from which we launch ourselves to higher places." In search of something more expansive, expressive, and timeless, Young discovered all this, and more, in children's books.

Work

Young's first book, The Mean Mouse and Other Mean Stories, was published by Harper & Row in 1962.  He expected it to be his first and last book, but it won an American Institute of Graphic Arts award and launched a career that has resulted in almost one hundred books for children.  Most of his books are visual masterpieces using colors and images to convey hidden symbolism. His meticulously rendered works have utilized pencil, pastel, cut paper, collage, ink, photographs, and found materials.

"A Chinese painting is often accompanied by words. They are complementary. There are things that words do that pictures never can, and likewise, there are images that words can never describe. I feel the story has to be an exciting and moving experience for a child. Before I am involved with a project, I must be moved, and, as I grow, I try to create something exciting. It is my purpose to stimulate growth in the reader as an active participant. To get the story across for me, mostly it's the feeling. I think that if the book evokes a reaction of some sort, either positive or negative, I think it would have done what it is supposed to do."

The subject and style of each story provide Young with the initial inspiration for his art and with the motivation for design, sequence, and pace. Accuracy in research is essential to his work, too – whether he is illustrating fantasy, folk tale, or fact. According to Young, a strong foundation of credibility must be established in order to create new and exciting images. Through such images, he hopes to capture his readers and ultimately expand their awareness.

Young won the 1990 Caldecott Medal for illustrating Lon Po Po, his version of a Red-Riding Hood story from China. The annual award from the American Library Association recognizes the previous year's "most distinguished American picture book for children". He has also been a runner-up twice (two Honor Books), for The Emperor and the Kite and Seven Blind Mice. For his lifetime contribution as a children's illustrator, he was U.S. nominee in both 1992 and 2000 for the biennial, international Hans Christian Andersen Award, the highest international recognition available to creators of children's books. In 2016, Young was honored with the Lifetime Achievement Award (Contemporary) from the Society of Illustrators.

According to Young, "Producing a book becomes part of the spirit of each person who touched it and those who'd touched them."  During a Horn Book acceptance speech, Young spoke about the 'Eight Matters of the Heart', the place where he said that he puts his mind before he does his work (for more information, read Young's book, Voices of the Heart.) When asked to elaborate, he said, "We put ourselves in jeopardy in life if we don't have our mind and body in the right place.  The eight matters must accompany me wherever I tread so that I know the time that I have in this world is well spent."

Exhibits

Young's original art for his books has been the subject of exhibits such as "Journey Without End" at the National Center for Children's Illustrated Literature in Abiline, Texas (2011–2012). He has participated in many group shows such as the Michaelson Gallery's Children’s Illustration Celebration.

T'ai chi

In 1964, Young met the renowned t'ai chi master, Cheng Man-ch'ing.  He became one of Cheng's top disciples in America, and was one of his two principal translators. Besides being a master of t'ai chi and Chinese medicine, Cheng was a highly respected master of Chinese painting, poetry and calligraphy. Being Chinese and an artist, Young was able to appreciate and absorb much of what Cheng had to say in those fields. Young is now a respected t'ai chi master in his own right, and has been teaching t'ai chi students for over three decades. He also enjoys swimming and says that his favorite sound is the sound of waves lapping the shore.

Awards and honors
Young has received over fifty awards and honors for his work, among them:
 Caldecott Medal: Lon Po Po: A Red Riding Hood Story from China 1990 
 Caldecott Honor: The Emperor and the Kite 1967 
 Caldecott Honor: Seven Blind Mice 1992
 Hans Christian Andersen Award U.S. nominee 1992 and 2000
 Mazza Medallion of Excellence for Artistic Diversity: 2002
 Boston Globe–Horn Book Award - Nonfiction: The Double Life of Pocahontas 1984 
 Boston Globe–Horn Book Award - Picture book: Seven Blind Mice 1992 
 Boston Globe–Horn Book Award - Picture book: Lon Po Po 1990 
 Boston Globe–Horn Book Honor - Picture book: Yeh Shen 1983 
 Asian/Pacific American Awards for Literature - Picture book: Wabi Sabi 2008-2009 
 Asian/Pacific American Awards for Literature - Picture book: The House Baba Built: An Artist's Childhood in China 2011-2012 
 Washington Irving Children's Choice Book Award: Pinocchio 1997, The Hunter 2000
 Publishers Weekly Best Illustrated Books selection: The House Baba Built 2011
 Publishers Weekly Best Illustrated Books selection: Nighttime Ninja, 2012
 Children's Book Council Children's Choice Award: Nighttime Ninja 2013
 Society of Illustrators Lifetime Achievement Award 2016
 The New York Times Best Illustrated Books 2016: Cat From Hunger Mountain 
 Eric Carle Museum Lifetime Achievement Award 2017

Young's books have received the ALA Notable, Junior Library Guild, Parents' Choice, New York Times' Best Illustrated, Publishers Weekly Best Illustrated, and Boston Globe Horn Book Honors, among others. Many of his books have been translated into other languages.

Works

Self-Illustrated; for children 
(With Hilary Beckett) The Rooster's Horns: A Chinese Puppet Play to Make and Perform, 1978.
(Reteller) The Terrible Nung Gwama: A Chinese Folktale, 1978.
(Adaptor) The Lion and the Mouse: An Aesop Fable, 1979.
High on a Hill: A Book of Chinese Riddles, 1980.
Up a Tree, 1983.
The Other Bone, 1984.
(Translator) Lon Po Po: A Red-Riding Hood Story from China, 1989.
(Reteller) Seven Blind Mice, 1992 (a version of The Blind men and an elephant).
(Reteller) Moon Mother: A Narrative American Creation Tale, 1993.
(Reteller) Red Thread, 1993.
(Reteller) Little Plum, 1994.
(Reteller) Donkey Trouble, 1995.
(Adaptor) Pinocchio, 1995.
(Reteller) Night Visitors, 1995.
Cat and Rat: The Legend of the Chinese zodiac, 1995.
(Reteller) Mouse Match: A Chinese Folktale, 1997 (a version of The Mouse Turned into a Maid).
(Adaptor) Genesis, 1997.
Voices of the Heart, 1997.
(Reteller) The Lost Horse: A Chinese Folktale, 1998.
Monkey King, 2001.
What About Me?, 2002.
I, Doko: The Tale of the Basket, 2004.
Sons of the Dragon King, 2004.
Beyond the Great Mountains, 2005.
My Mei Mei, 2006.
Tiger of the Snows, 2006.
Hook, 2009.
The House Baba Built, 2011.
Should You Be a River, 2015.
Cat From Hunger Mountain, 2016.
Voices of the Heart, 2019. (New edition).
(Reteller, with Stephen Cowan)The Weather’s Bet, 2020 (a version of Aesop The Wind and the Sun).

Illustrator
Janice May Udry, The Mean Mouse and Other Mean Stories, 1962.
Leland B. Jacobs and Sally Nohelty, editors, Poetry for Young Scientists, 1964.
Margaret Hillert, The Yellow Boat, 1966.
Jane Yolen, The Emperor and the Kite, 1967.
Robert Wyndam, editor, Chinese Mother Goose Rhymes, 1968.
Kermit Krueger, The Golden Swans: A Picture Story from Thailand, 1969.
Mel Evans, The Tiniest Sound, 1969.
Jane Yolen, The Seventh Mandarin, 1970.
Renee K. Weiss, The Bird from the Sea, 1970.
Diane Wolkstein, Eight Thousand Stones: A Chinese Folktale, 1972.
Jane Yolen, The Girl Who Loved the Wind, 1972.
L. C. Hunt, editor, The Horse from Nowhere, 1973.
Donnarae MacCann and Olga Richard, The Child's First Books, 1973.
Elizabeth Foreman Lewis, Young Fu of the Upper Yangtze, 1973.
Diane Wolkstein, The Red Lion: A Tale of Ancient Persia, 1977.
Feenie Ziner, Cricket Boy: A Chinese Tale, 1977.
N. J. Dawood, Tales from the Arabian Nights, 1978.
Diane Wolkstein, White Wave: A Chinese Tale, 1979.
Priscilla Jaquith, Bo Rabbit Smart for True: Folktales from the Gullah, 1981.
Al-Ling Louie, Yeh-Shen: A Cinderella Story from China, 1982.
Mary Scioscia, Bicycle Rider, 1983.
Rafe Martin, Foolish Rabbit's Big Mistake, 1985.
Jean Fritz, The Double Life of Pocahontas, 1985.
Margaret Leaf, Eyes of the Dragon, 1987.
James Howe, I Wish I Were a Butterfly, 1987.
Tony Johnston, Whale Song, 1987.
Richard Lewis, In the Night, Still Dark, 1988.
Nancy Larrick, editor, Cats Are Cats, 1988.
Robert Frost, Birches, 1988.
Oscar Wilde, The Happy Prince, 1989.
Lafcadio Hearn, The Voice of the Great Bell, retold by Margaret Hodges, 1989.
Ruth Y. Radin, High in the Mountains, 1989.
Nancy Larrick, editor, Mice Are Nice, 1990.
Richard Lewis, All of You Was Singing, 1991.
Nancy White Carlstrom, Goodbye, Geese, 1991.
Barabara Savage Horton, What Comes in Spring?, 1992.
Mary Calhoun, While I Sleep, 1992.
Audrey Osofsky, Dreamcatcher, 1992.
Laura Krauss Melmed, The First Song Ever Sung, 1993.
Eleanor Coerr, Sadako and The Thousand Paper Cranes, 1993.
Isaac Olaleye, Bitter Bananas, 1994.
Shulamith Levey Oppenheim, reteller, Iblis, 1994.
Penny Pollock, reteller, The Turkey Girl: A Zuni Cinderella Story, 1996 ( a Native American version of Cinderella)
Lisa Westberg Peters, October Smiled Back, 1996.
Jack London, White Fang, 1999.
Mary Casanova, The Hunter: A Chinese Folktale, 2000.
Dorothea P. Seeber, A Pup Just for Me—A Boy Just for Me, 2000.
Tony Johnston, Desert Song, 2000.
Nikki Grimes, Tai Chi Morning: Snapshots of China, 2004.
Andrea Cheng, Shanghai Messenger, 2005.
Dennis Haseley, Twenty Heartbeats, 2008.
Mark Reibstein, Wabi Sabi, 2008.
Kimiko Kajikawa, Tsunami!, 2009.
Brenda Z. Guiberson, Moon Bear, 2010.
Robert Burleigh, Tiger of the Snows: Tenzing Norgay: The Boy Whose Dream Was Everest, 2010.
Ashley Ramsden, Seven Fathers 2011.
Michelle Cuevas, The Masterwork of a Painting Elephant 2011.
Marilyn Singer, A Strange Place to Call Home: The World's Most Dangerous Habitats & the Animals That Call Them Home, 2012.  
Barbara DaCosta, Nighttime Ninja, 2012.
Gary Golio, Bird and Diz, 2015.
Barbara DaCosta, Mighty Moby, 2017.
Gary Golio, Smile: How Young Charlie Chaplin Taught the World to Laugh (and Cry), 2019.
Mark Reibstein, Yugen, 2019.
Brenda Peterson, Catastrophe by the Sea, 2019.
Barbara DaCosta, Night Shadows, 2020.

Film
Sadako and the Thousand Paper Cranes, based on the story by Eleanor Coerr

Art Exhibits
"Picturing Poetry." Group exhibit. Art Institute of Chicago, Chicago, Illinois. November 17, 2012 – May 12, 2013.
"Journey Without End." Solo exhibit. National Center for Children's Illustrated Literature, Abiline, Texas (2011–2012).

“Ed Young” solo exhibition at the Tang Gallery in Bisbee, Arizona.  (2010).

See also

References

"Ed (Tse-chun) Young." Major Authors and Illustrators for Children and Young Adults, 2nd ed., 8 vols. Gale Group, 2002.
Kotch, Laura and Leslie Zackman. The Author Studies Handbook: Helping Students Build Powerful Connections to Literature. New York: Scholastic Professional Books, 1995.
Primm, E. Russell III, ed. Favorite Children's Authors and Illustrators. Excelsior, Minn.: Tradition Books, 2003.
Silvey, Anita, ed. The Essential Guide to Children's Books and Their Creators. Boston:Houghton Mifflin Company, 2002.

External links
 Biographicon: On-line Biography of Ed Young
 Ed Young's Website
 Northeast Children’s Literature Collection, University of Connecticut: main archive of Ed Young's artwork
 Kimiko Kajikawa, Children's Book Author: Ed Young Links
 Seven Impossible Things Before Breakfast: Interview with Ed Young
 Video interview with Ed Young
 PaperTigers.org: In-depth interview with Ed Young
  An exhibit of forty pieces of Ed Young's art for books.
  All the Wonders podcast interview, 2017

1931 births
American children's writers
Caldecott Medal winners
Chinese children's writers
Chinese illustrators
American children's book illustrators
Chinese children's book illustrators
20th-century illustrators of fairy tales
21st-century illustrators of fairy tales
Chinese tai chi practitioners
Living people
Writers from Tianjin
Artists from Tianjin
Artists from Shanghai
People from Hastings-on-Hudson, New York
Writers who illustrated their own writing